Manny Perez may refer to:

Manny Pérez (born 1969), Dominican American actor
Manny Perez (soccer) (born 1999), American soccer player
Manuel Perez (animator) (1914–1981), American animator

See also
Manuel Perez (disambiguation)